Jack Booker (4 June 1915 – 17 April 2003) was a New Zealand cricketer. He played in one first-class match for Canterbury in 1947/48.

See also
 List of Canterbury representative cricketers

References

External links
 

1915 births
2003 deaths
New Zealand cricketers
Canterbury cricketers
Cricketers from Christchurch